Pirəhmədli (also, Beyuk-Pir-Akhmedly, Pirakhmedli, and Pirakhmedly) is a village in the Fuzuli District of Azerbaijan. It was liberated from Armenian occupation on 17 October 2020 by the Azeri army.

References 

Populated places in Fuzuli District